The Ryonggang Line is a non-electrified standard-gauge secondary line of the Korean State Railway located entirely within Namp'o Special City, South P'yŏngan Province, North Korea, running from Ryonggang on the P'yŏngnam Line to Mayŏng. The line connects to the Husan Line to Yangmak at Husan.

History
The Ryonggang Line was originally opened as the Yonggang Line by the Chosen Government Railway (Sentetsu) prior to 1937.

Services

Freight
Most freight on the line is outbound from a mine at Mayŏng and a granite quarry on the Husan Line.

Passenger

A local train, 734, operates on the entirety of this line from Mayŏng to Ryonggang, continuing on to Kangsŏ on the P'yŏngnam Line, with a scheduled travel time of two hours fifteen minutes according to the 2002 timetable; the return trip is train number 733, taking two hours to make the trip.

Route
A yellow background in the "Distance" box indicates that section of the line is not electrified.

References

Railway lines in North Korea
Standard gauge railways in North Korea